Live in Berlin is the first live album by American musician Rozz Williams, formerly of deathrock band Christian Death. It was released by Triple X Records on February 15, 2000. Musically, the album is a lot heavier than many of Williams's other releases, with a sound similar to the Spiders from Mars or the New York Dolls. It was recorded in October 1993, shortly before the formation of Daucus Karota. The album includes songs which had never before been released.

Credits
Brian Butler - Guitar
Edward Colver - Photography
Christian Omar Madrigal Izzo - Drums
Rozz Williams - Vocals
Jeff Zimmitti - Design

Track listing

References

Fasolino, Greg; Yeske, Katherine; Ferguson, Scott. "Christian Death". TrouserPress.com. Accessed March 28, 2013.

2000 live albums
Rozz Williams albums
Triple X Records albums